Gerard Rigby is a British figure skater who competed in ice dance.

With partner Barbara Thompson, he won the bronze medal at the 1956 World Figure Skating Championships.

Competitive highlights 
With Barbara Thompson

References 

British male ice dancers